The Dirección General del Sistema Penitenciario de Guatemala (DGSP "Prison System of Guatemala") is the prison system of Guatemala, headquartered in Zone 1, Guatemala City, Guatemala. It is a part of the Ministry of the Interior.

Facilities
Guatemala City area
 Pavón Prison - Fraijanes
 Centro Preventivo para Hombres - Zone 18, Guatemala City
 Centro de Orientacion Femenino - Fraijanes
 Prisión de Mujeres (Women's Prison) Santa Teresa - Zone 18, Guatemala City

Antigua Guatemala, Sacatepéquez Department
 Prisión de Mujeres (Women's Prison)

Izabal Department
 Centro de Rehabilitación Departamental

Petén Department
 Granja Penal Santa Elena (Prison farm)

Quetzaltenango Department
 Granja de Rehabilitación - Cantel (Prison farm)

Zacapa
 Preventivo Zacapa

Escuintla
 Canadá Penal Farm

References

External links
 Dirección General del Sistema Penitenciario de Guatemala 

Law enforcement in Guatemala
Prison and correctional agencies